Phillipe Carteau (also known as Philip Karto) is a French businessman and fashion designer. He is the founder of the Philip Karto brand that customizes vintage luxury leather handbags.

Karto's work includes collages, sculptures, and jewelry design but he's most commonly known for his customization work in modifying high-end dated luxury items.

Early life 
Karto grew up in Bandol but was born in Toulon, the South of France on 12th of February 1973. The North American culture had always fascinated him from an early time in his life.

Career
From 2004-2006, Karto created and owned the jewelry brand Caption in Europe which he later sold. Inspired by the rock and roll trend, he created jewelry that was decked out with skulls. He had collaborations with Faith Connexion, Kulte and Christian Audigier Jewelry. 

By 2010, Karto had reached a point where he was at a crossroads with fashion as it was something he did not understand anymore.  When he grew tired of his Louis Vuitton Keepall bag that his mother loaned him, he made the decision to paint it. People around him seemed to respond to the piece and so he bought many similar vintage bags and took them apart, cleaned them up and swapped out some of the leather parts with sustainable pieces, added silver instead of the metal and painted objects on the side with quotes on the other.  This led to the creation of his namesake brand, Philip Karto. 

After his move to Miami, Florida in 2013, he started a customized luxury leather goods brand where he focused his work on Louis Vuitton handbags that he transformed into pop culture inspired products in 2017. The brand has gained international recognition. The same year, he launched “Prohibition”, a ready-to-wear line.

References 

Living people
French businesspeople
French fashion designers
1973 births